The 1953 Texas Longhorns football team represented the University of Texas in the 1953 college football season.

Schedule

Awards and honors
 Carlton Massey, end, Consensus All-American

References

Texas
Texas Longhorns football seasons
Southwest Conference football champion seasons
Texas Longhorns football